Yitzhak ”Isi” Yanouka is the Israeli Ambassador to Cameroon.

He served as Ambassador to the Ivory Coast, concurrent in Togo, Benin and Burkina Faso, from 2013 until 2016. In 2010, the Angolan government refused to receive openly gay Yanouka as the new ambassador due to his sexuality.

Yanouka married his husband, Rabbi Mikie Goldstein, in the 1990s, making him the first same sex spouse of an Israeli envoy.

References

Ambassadors of Israel to Benin
Ambassadors of Israel to Burkina Faso
Ambassadors of Israel to Ivory Coast
Gay diplomats
Ambassadors of Israel to Cameroon
Ambassadors of Israel to Togo
Year of birth missing (living people)
Living people